Henry Stöhr (born 6 June 1960) is an East German judoka, who competed for the SC Dynamo Hoppegarten / Sportvereinigung (SV) Dynamo.

He was born in Reichenbach. Stöhr won medals at international competitions included over 15 national titles.

External links
 
 Henry Stöhr at berlingeschichte

References

1960 births
Living people
German male judoka
Olympic judoka of East Germany
Olympic judoka of Germany
Judoka at the 1988 Summer Olympics
Judoka at the 1992 Summer Olympics
Olympic silver medalists for East Germany
Olympic medalists in judo
Medalists at the 1988 Summer Olympics